Maurício José da Silveira Júnior (born 21 October 1988) is a Brazilian professional footballer who plays as a midfielder for Portuguese Primeira Liga club Portimonense.

Club career
Mauricio began his career with Brazilian side Fluminense in 2007 and made 52 appearances for the club with two goals scored.

On 2 February 2010, Maurício signed for Russian Premier League side Terek Grozny from Fluminense. He scored 29 goals in 172 appearances for the club.

On 17 January 2016, Maurício moved to Zenit Saint Petersburg on a six-month contract, with the option of an extension at the end of it. On 19 May 2016, Zenit extended Maurício's contract until the end of the 2018–19 season. On 24 July 2017, he was released from his contract by mutual consent.

PAOK
On 31 August 2017, PAOK announced the signing of Mauricio on a three-year contract. On 30 October, he scored both goals as PAOK won 2–0 at home to Asteras Tripoli in the Greek Super League.

On 7 October 2018, he opened the score in a 2–0 home win game against Apollon Smyrnis. It was his first goal of the 2018–19 season and he was named MVP of the game. On 3 February 2019, his goal in a 1–1 draw with AEK Athens helped PAOK remain unbeaten in the SuperLeague.

On 10 March 2019, he suffered an anterior cruciate ligament injury which kept him out until late September.
After a very difficult period for the midfielder marred by injury (203 days to be exact), Mauricio returned to action in an away game against AEK Athens on 29 September 2019.

According to various reports, Spanish club Getafe and French side Marseille were linked with signing Mauricio with his contract set to expire in July 2020.

Panathinaikos
On 11 October 2020, it was announced that Panathinaikos had signed Maurício on a two-year contract for an undisclosed fee.

Rodina Moscow
On 20 September 2022, Rodina Moscow announced the signing of Maurício.

Portimonense
On 25 January 2023, Maurício signed with Portimonense in Portugal.

International career
Maurício indicated that he would be likely to accept a call-up for Russia national football team if asked.

Career statistics

Club

Honours
Zenit Saint Petersburg  
 Russian Cup: 2015–16 
 Russian Super Cup: 2016

PAOK
Super League Greece: 2018–19
Greek Cup: 2017–18, 2018–19

Panathinaikos
Greek Cup: 2021–22

References

1988 births
People from São José dos Campos
Footballers from São Paulo (state)
Living people
Brazilian footballers
Association football midfielders
Fluminense FC players
FC Akhmat Grozny players
FC Zenit Saint Petersburg players
PAOK FC players
Panathinaikos F.C. players
Portimonense S.C. players
Russian Premier League players
Russian First League players
Super League Greece players
Brazilian expatriate footballers
Expatriate footballers in Russia
Brazilian expatriate sportspeople in Russia
Expatriate footballers in Greece
Brazilian expatriate sportspeople in Greece
Expatriate footballers in Portugal
Brazilian expatriate sportspeople in Portugal